Florence Cestac (born 18 July 1949) is a French cartoonist and former publisher. She is the first woman to have won the prestigious Grand Prix de la ville d'Angoulême, in 2000, and was the only one until Rumiko Takahashi in 2019.

Career
Born in Pont-Audemer, Cestac initially worked as an illustrator. In 1972, she took over the bookstore "Futuropolis" with her husband , and transformed it into the comics publisher .

Her series Cestac pour les grands, aimed at an adult audience, brought her popular success and recognition. One album,  (1996), was adapted for the stage and as the 2005 film The Demon Stirs.

Awards
 1989: Alph-Art humour, festival d'Angoulême, for Harry Mickson vol. 5
 1997: Alph-Art humour for Le Démon de midi
 2000: Grand Prix de la ville d'Angoulême
 2014: Grand Prix Saint-Michel

Books
 (1979-1988)
 (1994-2002) with 
 (1996)
 (2005)
 (2013)
 (2006-2010)
 (2007)
 (2009) written by Jean Teulé. Biographical graphic novel about the comics artist Charlie Schlingo
 (2011) written by Tonino Benacquista
 (2015) written by Daniel Pennac
 (2021)

References
 Jean-Pierre Mercier, Les Pieds de nez de Florence Cestac, Angoulême, Musée de la bande dessinée, 2001.

External links
 

French comics artists
French female comics artists
French women artists
Living people
1949 births
People from Eure
Grand Prix de la ville d'Angoulême winners